Brendon Hartley (born 10 November 1989) is a New Zealand professional racing driver who is currently competing in the FIA World Endurance Championship with Toyota Gazoo Racing.

He won the 2015 FIA World Endurance Championship, alongside his teammates Mark Webber and Timo Bernhard, and also went on to win the 2017 FIA World Endurance Championship alongside Bernhard and Earl Bamber. He won the 2017 24 Hours of Le Mans with Bamber and Bernhard, the 2020 24 Hours of Le Mans with Sébastien Buemi and Kazuki Nakajima, and the 2022 24 Hours of Le Mans with Buemi and Ryō Hirakawa.

He formerly competed in Formula One for Scuderia Toro Rosso, making his debut at the 2017 United States Grand Prix.

Career

Hartley was born in Palmerston North in a family well integrated within motorsport. His father, Brian, had raced in many forms of motorsport, including Formula Atlantic. At the age of six, Hartley began his motor racing career in kart racing, following in his brother Nelson's footsteps. Six years later, he competed in his first full-scale race championship, competing in the Formula First category. Hartley finished the season in seventh. In 2003, he won that year's New Zealand Formula Ford Festival which resulted in him getting a drive for the following year's Formula Ford championship. In a car his brother had used the previous year, he started four races and won two of them.

After a season in Formula Toyota New Zealand, Hartley moved to Europe, competing in the Eurocup Formula Renault 2.0 and Formula Renault 2.0 Northern European Cup (NEC). He finished 14th and 10th in the Drivers' Championship in the Eurocup and North European Cup respectively, taking a podium position at Anderstorp in the latter. In his second year in Formula Renault, he stayed in the Eurocup, but moved from the NEC to the Italian championship. He took three wins in the Eurocup and three podiums in the Italian championship, and took the championship title in the Eurocup.

In 2007 Hartley also made his Formula Three debut in the Masters of Formula 3 at Zolder event, finishing 4th. This resulted in a test with A1 Team New Zealand and the role of the rookie driver for the series. In 2008, he competed in the British Formula 3 Championship for Carlin Motorsport, winning five times, and eventually finished the championship in third. He also competed in eight races in the Formula Three Euroseries for Carlin and RC Motorsport, and achieved two finishes in the points, although he was ineligible for points. In non-championship races, Hartley finished fifth at the Masters of Formula 3, and third at the Macau Grand Prix. After crashing in the qualification race, he started 20th on the grid and recorded the fastest race lap.

He stayed with Carlin for the full F3 Euroseries in 2009, finishing eleventh despite missing two rounds due to Formula Renault 3.5 Series commitments. In that series, Hartley competed for the defending champion Tech 1 Racing team, and ended fifteenth in the championship.

He was signed at Tech 1 for a full season of Formula Renault 3.5 in 2010, where he was partnered by Australian and fellow Red Bull Junior driver, Daniel Ricciardo. During the series' summer break it was announced that Hartley had been dropped from the Red Bull Junior Team. His seat was taken by British Formula 3 championship leader Jean-Éric Vergne.

Despite the loss of his Red Bull backing, Hartley made his GP2 Series début at Monza in September, replacing Vladimir Arabadzhiev at the Coloni team. He scored a point in the season finale at Yas Marina to place 27th in the championship.

For 2011, Hartley returned to Formula Renault 3.5, driving alongside Jan Charouz for the Gravity–Charouz Racing team. He also returned to GP2 for the eighth round of the series at Spa-Francorchamps, replacing Kevin Mirocha and driving alongside Johnny Cecotto Jr. in the Ocean Racing Technology team, for whom he had tested before the start of the season. He finished in fifth place in his first race with the team, and 19th in the overall championship.

Hartley began the 2012 season without a drive, but returned to Ocean for the second round of the championship in Bahrain in place of Jon Lancaster. After the two rounds in Bahrain, he was in turn replaced by Víctor Guerin. He finished 25th in the championship.

With no suitable single-seater drives available, Hartley joined the Murphy Prototypes sportscar team, which was competing in the LMP2 class in the European Le Mans Series. Following the cancellation of the second round of the ELMS championship (which would have been Hartley's début event) and the series' future in doubt, Murphy was one of several ELMS teams invited to compete as a guest entry in the 6 Hours of Spa-Francorchamps, a round of the more prestigious FIA World Endurance Championship. Driving the team's Oreca 03-Nissan, Hartley finished tenth overall and third in the LMP2 class with teammates Warren Hughes and Jody Firth. The trio teamed up again for the 24 Hours of Le Mans, but retired from the race after completing 196 laps of the circuit.

In October 2017, Hartley was offered a drive in Formula One by Toro Rosso for the United States Grand Prix which was held in Austin. Hartley replaced Pierre Gasly, who was absent contesting the Super Formula Championship final. It was Hartley's F1 debut where he became the ninth New Zealander to race in Formula One.

In November 2018, Hartley was released from the Toro Rosso team. In early May 2019, Toyota Gazoo Racing's WEC program announced that Hartley would be driving for the team for the full 2019/20 season, replacing the former occupant, Fernando Alonso. In August 2019, Geox Dragon Racing announced they had contracted Hartley for the 2019/20 Formula E season.

Formula One

Red Bull Racing (2008–2010) 
In February 2008, aged 18, Hartley got his first taste of Formula One. He was invited to perform a show run for Red Bull Racing in Riyadh. From here he performed the initial three-day shake-down test for Scuderia Toro Rosso's 2008 spec car, the STR3. In November 2008, it was announced he would be providing cover for Mark Webber, who had broken his leg in a cycling accident, by performing testing duties alongside permanent test driver Sébastien Buemi for Red Bull in the 2008 RB4 F1 car.

For the  season, Hartley was appointed as official reserve driver for both the Red Bull Racing and Scuderia Toro Rosso teams. However, unable to get his mandatory superlicence approved until April 2009, he was replaced in this role by retired F1 driver David Coulthard for the first races in Melbourne and Sepang. Hartley made his debut as reserve and test driver at the Spanish Grand Prix on 8 May. He is the first New Zealander to achieve F1 driver status since Mike Thackwell in 1984. He was replaced in the role by fellow Red Bull Junior driver Jaime Alguersuari for the second half of the season. However Hartley did not return to the reserve driver role with Red Bull and Toro Rosso following Jaime Alguersuari's promotion to a race seat, preferring to focus on his F3 and Renault World Series. David Coulthard again took over the role.

For the  season, Hartley was again appointed official reserve driver for both Red Bull Racing and Scuderia Toro Rosso. He shared the reserve driver duties with his Formula Renault 3.5 teammate, Australian Daniel Ricciardo. The two drivers shared the duties on a race-by-race basis until round six of the championship. Following this race, Hartley's support from Red Bull was dropped, based on the fact he had not won a race in his season and a half in the championship.

On 13 September 2012, he participated in the young driver test at Magny-Cours. He drove 87 laps for Mercedes on the final day, setting the third quickest time behind Jules Bianchi (Ferrari) and Rodolfo González (Force India).

Mercedes (2012–2013)
Hartley said that the simulator development work and the test drive with Mercedes would give him a new opportunity to get back into Formula One.

Toro Rosso (2017–2018)

Hartley made his Formula One début for Toro Rosso at the 2017 United States Grand Prix, replacing Pierre Gasly, who was absent to take part in the final round of the Japanese Super Formula Championship; he raced with the number 39. He qualified in 17th position after being eliminated during Qualifying 1, but started from 19th position due to engine penalties. He finished the race in 13th position, one lap down on race winner Lewis Hamilton. It was confirmed on 26 October that Hartley would remain a Toro Rosso driver for the remainder of the season, replacing Daniil Kvyat, and he chose 28 (the same number previously used by Will Stevens in 2015) as his permanent race number.

On 16 November 2017 Hartley was confirmed by Toro Rosso as a full-time driver alongside Pierre Gasly for the  season. Hartley scored points at the Azerbaijan Grand Prix with tenth, German Grand Prix with tenth again and the United States Grand Prix with his highest finish in ninth. He finished the season in nineteenth place, four places and 25 points behind his teammate, albeit with two more non-finishes.

On 26 November 2018 it was confirmed that Hartley would not continue with Toro Rosso for 2019. He was replaced by Thai driver Alexander Albon.

Ferrari (2019)
On 4 February 2019, Scuderia Ferrari announced that Hartley would be one of their development drivers for the 2019 season, alongside former Manor and Sauber and current Formula E driver Pascal Wehrlein.

Formula E
Following his exit from Formula One, Hartley reunited with Porsche for testing ahead of the manufacturer's debut in the championship. In August 2019, it was announced he would make his debut in the 2019–20 season with GEOX Dragon Racing, partnering Nico Müller.

Hartley left the Dragon Racing team with immediate effect in July 2020. Since then, he has been replaced by Sérgio Sette Câmara.

Sports prototypes

European Le Mans Series
Hartley was signed to drive an Oreca 03 for Murphy Prototypes in the 2012 and 2013 European Le Mans Series as well as the 2012 and 2013 24 Hours of Le Mans races. This was also complemented with a drive in the Rolex Sports Car Series for Starworks Motorsport in the Daytona Prototype category in 2013. He completed all but one round in that series due to a clash for the final round of the 2013 European Le Mans Series.

FIA World Endurance Championship

Porsche announced Hartley as a factory driver of the Porsche 919 Hybrid in the FIA World Endurance Championship. Over the next four years, he won the 2015 and 2017 FIA World Endurance Championship. He also won the 2017 24 Hours of Le Mans and placed second in 2015 sharing the car with drivers including Timo Bernhard, former Formula One driver Mark Webber and fellow Kiwi Earl Bamber.

After one year in Formula One, Hartley was back in 2019 1000 Miles of Sebring, replacing Jenson Button in SMP Racing. He finished the race on the podium, behind two Toyota TS050s. Weeks later, Toyota announced that he would be driving for the team for 2019/20 season replacing two-time Formula One world champion Fernando Alonso.

WeatherTech SportsCar Championship
Hartley kept his ties with the American racing scene driving again for Starworks Motorsport in the 2014 and 2015 Daytona 24 Hours. In the 2016 Daytona 24 Hour he drove with Ford Chip Ganassi Racing. This tie saw him invited to drive for Chip Ganassi's Indycar team in 2018 but he had to decline due to securing a drive in Formula One with Toro Rosso. The 2017 WeatherTech SportsCar Championship saw him do three rounds for Extreme Speed Motorsports driving a Nissan Onroak DPi culminating in a victory at the 2017 Petit Le Mans.

Racing record

Career summary

 Hartley was ineligible to score points.
* Season still in progress.

Complete Formula 3 Euro Series results
(key) (Races in bold indicate pole position) (Races in italics indicate fastest lap)

 As Hartley was a guest driver, he was ineligible to score championship points.

Complete Formula Renault 3.5 Series results
(key) (Races in bold indicate pole position) (Races in italics indicate fastest lap)

Complete GP2 Series results
(key) (Races in bold indicate pole position) (Races in italics indicate fastest lap)

Complete Formula One results
(key) (Races in bold indicate pole position; races in italics indicates fastest lap)

 Did not finish, but was classified as he had completed more than 90% of the race distance.

Complete Formula E results
(key) (Races in bold indicate pole position; races in italics indicate fastest lap)

Sportscars results

Complete 24 Hours of Le Mans results

Complete European Le Mans Series results
(key) (Races in bold indicate pole position) (Races in italics indicate fastest lap)

Complete FIA World Endurance Championship results

 As Hartley was a guest driver, he was ineligible to score points.
* Season still in progress.

Rolex Sports Car Series results
(key) (Races in bold indicate pole position, races in italics indicate fastest lap.  Results are overall/class)

IMSA SportsCar Championship

1 The No. 7 of Starworks Motorsport withdrew from the 12 Hours of Sebring before Practice.

Notes

External links

 
 

1989 births
Living people
Sportspeople from Palmerston North
People educated at Palmerston North Boys' High School
New Zealand racing drivers
Formula Renault Eurocup drivers
Italian Formula Renault 2.0 drivers
Formula Renault 2.0 NEC drivers
A1 Grand Prix Rookie drivers
British Formula Three Championship drivers
Formula 3 Euro Series drivers
Formula Ford drivers
Toyota Racing Series drivers
GP2 Series drivers
World Series Formula V8 3.5 drivers
24 Hours of Le Mans drivers
24 Hours of Le Mans winning drivers
24 Hours of Daytona drivers
Rolex Sports Car Series drivers
European Le Mans Series drivers
FIA World Endurance Championship drivers
WeatherTech SportsCar Championship drivers
New Zealand Formula One drivers
Toro Rosso Formula One drivers
Formula E drivers
24H Series drivers
Motopark Academy drivers
Epsilon Euskadi drivers
Carlin racing drivers
RC Motorsport drivers
Tech 1 Racing drivers
P1 Motorsport drivers
Scuderia Coloni drivers
Charouz Racing System drivers
Ocean Racing Technology drivers
Murphy Prototypes drivers
Starworks Motorsport drivers
Toyota Gazoo Racing drivers
Dragon Racing drivers
Chip Ganassi Racing drivers
Mücke Motorsport drivers
SMP Racing drivers
Porsche Motorsports drivers
Extreme Speed Motorsports drivers
Action Express Racing drivers
Wayne Taylor Racing drivers
United Autosports drivers
Andretti Autosport drivers